Toutatis or Teutates is a Celtic god who was worshipped primarily in ancient Gaul and Britain. His name means "god of the tribe", and he has been widely interpreted as a tribal protector. According to Roman writer Lucan, the Gauls offered human sacrifices to him.

Name and nature
Toutatis (pronounced  in Gaulish) and its variants Toutates, Teutates, Tūtatus and Toutorīx, comes from the Gaulish Celtic root toutā, meaning 'tribe' or 'people' (compare Old Irish tuath and Welsh tud). A literal meaning would thus be "god of the tribe". A similar phrase is found in Irish mythology, which mentions the oath formula tongu do dia tongas mo thuath, roughly "I swear by the god by whom my tribe swears". Bernhard Maier proposes that his name derives from an older *teuto-tatis, with the meaning 'father of the tribe', although he notes that this etymology is uncertain.

It is believed Toutatis was a title for the tutelary gods of various tribes. Miranda Aldhouse-Green suggests that Toutatis was an epithet or description for Celtic tribal protector-gods, rather than a name. Paul-Marie Duval suggests that each tribe had its own Toutatis; he further considers the Gaulish Mars as the product of syncretism with the Celtic Toutatis, noting the great number of indigenous epithets under which Mars was worshipped.

Evidence

Inscriptions
Inscriptions dedicated to him have been found in Gaul (e.g. at Nîmes and Vaison-la-Romaine in France, and Mainz in Germany), in Britannia (e.g. at York, Old Carlisle, Castor and Hertfordshire), in Noricum, and in Rome, among other places. Some of these inscriptions combine his name with other gods such as Mars, Cocidius, Apollo, and Mercurius.

Written evidence
Toutatis is one of three Celtic gods mentioned by the Roman writer Lucan in his epic poem De Bello Civili or Pharsalia. Written in the first century AD, it names Toutatis, Taranis and Esus as three gods to whom the Gauls offered human sacrifices. In the 4th century commentary on Lucan, Commenta Bernensia, an author added that sacrifices to Toutatis were killed by drowning, and likened Toutatis to Mars or Mercury.

In his third-century work Divinae Institutiones, Roman writer Lactantius also names Toutatis as a Gaulish god to whom sacrifices were offered.

TOT finger rings

A large number of Romano-British finger rings inscribed with the name "TOT", thought to refer to Toutatis, have been found in eastern Britain, the vast majority in Lincolnshire, but some in Bedfordshire, Nottinghamshire and Leicestershire.  The distribution of these rings closely matches the territory of the Corieltauvi tribe.  In 2005 a silver ring inscribed DEO TOTA ("to the god Toutatis") and [VTERE] FELIX ([use this ring] happily") was discovered at Hockliffe, Bedfordshire.  This inscription confirms that the TOT inscription does indeed refer to the god Toutatis.

In 2012 a silver ring inscribed "TOT" was found in the area where the Hallaton Treasure had been discovered twelve years earlier.  Adam Daubney, an expert on this type of ring, suggests that Hallaton may have been a site of worship of the god Toutatis.

See also
Interpretatio Romana
Germanic Mercury
4179 Toutatis

References

Further reading
 Clémençon, Bernard; Ganne, Pierre M. "Toutatis chez les Arvernes: les graffiti à Totates du bourg routier antique de Beauclair (communes de Giat et de Voingt, Puy-de-Dôme)". In: Gallia, tome 66, fascicule 2, 2009. Archéologie de la France antique. pp. 153–169. [DOI: https://doi.org/10.3406/galia.2009.3369] ; www.persee.fr/doc/galia_0016-4119_2009_num_66_2_3369
 Lajoye, Patrice; Lemaître, Claude. "Une inscription votive à Toutatis découverte à Jort (Calvados, France)". In: Etudes Celtiques, vol. 40, 2014. pp. 21–28. [DOI: https://doi.org/10.3406/ecelt.2014.2423] ; www.persee.fr/doc/ecelt_0373-1928_2014_num_40_1_2423
M. Almagro‐Gorbea, A. J. Lorrio Alvarado, Teutates: el héroe fundador, Madrid, Real Academia de la Historia, 2011

External links

Celtic gods
War gods
Tutelary gods